Sefid Rud (also Romanized as Sefīd Rūd) is a village in Kalashtar Rural District, in the Central District of Rudbar County, Gilan Province, Iran. At the 2006 census, its population was 644, in 169 families.

References 

Populated places in Rudbar County